The 20943 / 20944 Bandra Terminus - Bhagat Ki Kothi Humsafar Express is an express train belonging to Western Railway zone that runs between Bandra Terminus and Bhagat Ki Kothi. It is currently being operated with 20943/20944 train numbers on a weekly basis.

Coach Composition 

The trains is completely 3-tier AC sleeper trains designed by Indian Railways with features of LED screen display to show information about stations, train speed etc. and will have announcement system as well, Vending machines for tea, coffee and milk, Bio toilets in compartments as well as CCTV cameras.

Service

The 20943/Bandra Terminus - Bhagat ki Kothi Humsafar Express has an average speed of 55 km/hr and covers 933.4 km in 17h 05m.

The 20944/Bhagat ki Kothi - Bandra Terminus Humsafar Express has an average speed of 54 km/hr and covers 933.4 km in 16h 50m.

Traction
Both trains are hauled by a Vadodara based WAP 5 / WAP 7 HOG Equipped locomotive from BDTS to BGKT and vice-versa.

Route & Halts 

The important halts of the train are:

Schedule

Rake Sharing

The train shares its rake with 22913/22914 Bandra Terminus - Saharsa Humsafar Express.

See also 

 Humsafar Express
 Bandra Terminus railway station
 Bhagat Ki Kothi railway station

Notes

References

External links 

19043/Bandra Terminus - Bhagat Ki Kothi Humsafar Express
 19044/Bhagat Ki Kothi - Bandra Terminus Humsafar Express

Humsafar Express trains
Rail transport in Gujarat
Rail transport in Maharashtra
Rail transport in Rajasthan
Transport in Mumbai
Transport in Jodhpur
Railway services introduced in 2018